Levenwick is a small village about  south of Lerwick, on the east side of the South Mainland of Shetland, Scotland. It is part of the parish of Dunrossness and the Levenwick Health Centre provides medical support for the Dunrossness area.It contains a local hall that you can hire and a campsite.As well as a small Sandy beach that has otters at it

In the literature of the isles, it is associated with George Stewart, author of the pioneering Shetland Fireside Tales, who lived here in his youth. Today Levenwick is home to a number of artists, including Amy Moncrieff, Neil McLean, Anne Bain and James Bruce Thomason. It was also where musician Ian Bairnson grew up.

Notable people 
Ian Bairnson

George Stewart

Neil Mclean

Anna Bairn

James Bruce Johnson

References

 This article is based on http://shetlopedia.com/Levenwick a GFDL wiki.

External links

Canmore - Levenwick Broch site record

Villages in Mainland, Shetland